The men's road race at the 1932 UCI Road World Championships was the sixth edition of the event. The race took place on Wednesday 31 August 1932 in Rome, Italy. The race was won by Alfredo Binda of Italy.

Final classification

References

Men's Road Race
UCI Road World Championships – Men's road race